Robert Emerson may refer to:
Robert L. Emerson (born 1948), American politician from Michigan
Rob Emerson (born 1981), American mixed martial artist and kickboxer
 Robert Emerson (scientist), American scientist, photosynthesis